John Vincent may refer to:

Politicians
John Vincent (MP), Member of Parliament for Chichester and Midhurst
John Carter Vincent (1900–1972), diplomat
M. John Vincent, Indian politician from Tamil Nadu
John Vincent (American politician), American politician from Montana

Sports
John Vincent (American football), American college football coach
Johnny Vincent (footballer) (1947–2006), English footballer

Religion
John Vincent (Carmelite) (1864-1943), Spanish priest, Venerable, born Juan Vicente Zengotitabengoa Lasuen
John H. Vincent (1832–1920), American Methodist bishop and theologian
John Ranulph Vincent, South African Anglican priest
John Vincent (bishop) (1894–1960), bishop of Damaraland, 1952–1960

Music
John Vincent (composer) (1902–1977), American composer
Johnny Vincent (1927–2000), record producer

Others
John Vincent (British Army officer) (1764–1848), British general
John Vincent (historian) (1937–2021), British historian
John Vincent (lawyer), American lawyer, New York District Attorney in 1880s
John Vincent (restaurateur) (born 1971), co-founder of Leon Restaurants
John Vincent (sailor) (1879–1941), English seaman and member of Sir Ernest Shackleton's Imperial Trans-Antarctic Expedition
John Painter Vincent (1776–1852), English surgeon

See also
Jean Vincent (1930–2013), footballer
Jon Vincent (1962–2000), adult film actor
Jack Vincent (1904–1999), English ornithologist